Scott Bannerman (born 21 March 1979 in Edinburgh) is a Scottish former footballer.

Bannerman's best season in senior football was when he was top goal scorer for Greenock Morton in season 2001–2002, in Peter Cormack's hastily put together squad that was relegated in their first season in the Scottish Football League Second Division after being relegated the previous season after suffering financial difficulty under previous chairman Hugh Scott.

After leaving Raith Rovers, Bannerman played for junior side Bathgate Thistle, and helped them win the Scottish Junior Cup for the first time.

Honours
Greenock Morton

Scottish Football League Third Division: 1
 2002/03

Bathgate Thistle

Scottish Junior Cup: 1
 2007/08

External links

1979 births
Living people
Footballers from Edinburgh
Association football midfielders
Scottish footballers
Hibernian F.C. players
Alloa Athletic F.C. players
Airdrieonians F.C. (1878) players
Greenock Morton F.C. players
Dumbarton F.C. players
Cowdenbeath F.C. players
Raith Rovers F.C. players
Bathgate Thistle F.C. players
Scottish Premier League players
Scottish Football League players
Scottish Junior Football Association players